Wilfred Harold Kerton Baker (6 January 1920 – 9 November 2000), known as Bill Baker, was a British Conservative Party politician. He was Member of Parliament for Banffshire from 1964 to 1974, when he lost his seat in the February election of that year to Hamish Watt of the Scottish National Party.

His father died when he was 10, and his mother married a parson. He attended The Thomas Hardye School and started a medicine degree at Nottingham University. He joined the Queen's Own Dorset Yeomanry. In the Second World War he was commissioned in the Royal Artillery. He was seriously injured in a motorcycle crash, however he resumed his war career in 1941. In 1945, he landed in France the day after D-Day in a glider with the 1st Airborne Division, and fought at the Battle of Arnhem. He finished the war with the rank of Major.

After the war, he graduated from Edinburgh University with a BSc in Agriculture. He attended the Cornell University on a Fulbright scholarship. In 1945 he married Kathleen Sloan Murray Bisset, who had been widowed during the war. From 1949 to 1953 he was factor of her family estates in Aberdeenshire and Banffshire. Later he was a cattle farmer in Rothiemay. He was also a Church of England lay preacher.

He was selected as a Conservative candidate in 1962 and elected in 1964. As an MP, he opposed Britain's entry into the Common Market, and opposed changes to laws on Sunday entertainments.

After leaving Parliament, he moved to the Channel Islands where he traded stamps, and later moved to Paignton, Devon, where he worked in a job centre.

His first wife died in 1987. They had a son and two daughters. He then married Jean Gordon Scott Skinner.

References

External links 
 

1920 births
2000 deaths
Unionist Party (Scotland) MPs
Scottish Conservative Party MPs
UK MPs 1964–1966
UK MPs 1966–1970
UK MPs 1970–1974